is a former Japanese football player.

Club statistics

References

External links

J. League

1983 births
Living people
Asia University (Japan) alumni
Association football people from Saitama Prefecture
Japanese footballers
J2 League players
Japan Football League players
Thespakusatsu Gunma players
Mitsubishi Mizushima FC players
Association football forwards